George Robert Wood (7 December 1865 – 3 September 1948) played first-class cricket for Somerset in 1893 and 1894. He was born at Reading, Berkshire and died at Lyme Regis, Dorset.

References

1865 births
1948 deaths
English cricketers
Somerset cricketers